Stevan Karadžić (born 16 November 1960) is a Montenegrin professional basketball coach and former player.

Early life
He was born 16 November 1960 in Nikšić, SR Montenegro, SFR Yugoslavia.

Playing career
Most of his playing career Karadžić spent in the Crvena zvezda. Between 1980 and 1989 he had played 296 matches and scored 3484 points (an average of 11.8 points per game). Karadzic played in the play-off final (1984 and 1985) and the final of the European Korać Cup in 1984. Best game Karadžić for Crvena zvezda is considered to be 1983/84 season, when he was named the top scorer of the season, scoring 642 points in 43 matches (an average of 14.9 points per game).

In addition to Crvena zvezda Karadžić played for Radnički Novi Sad, Puljanka and Gradine from Pula, Sloboda Tuzla and Borac Banja Luka in Bosnia and Herzegovina, Ebon from Nikšić and the Hungarian Soproni.

Coaching career
After finishing playing career, Karadžić devoted himself to coaching. He traveled as a coach of youth Crvena zvezda which became the champion of Serbia and Yugoslavia in 1998. In 1999, Karadžić led the Crvena zvezda, but was fired in 2001. Karadžić has returned to his post in the second half of the season 2006/2007, but the following season was once again fired.

Karadžić has coached Under-16 and Under-18 Yugoslavia national teams that took gold at the European championships in 2001 and 2005 respectively. As an assistant coach of Yugoslavia won gold at the 2002 World Championships in Indianapolis. From 2008 to 2010 he was head of the Serbian Hemofarm. In 2009 he was recognized as the best coach in the European Cup. Since 2010 to 2012, Karadžić led the Russian basketball club Yenisey, which back in 2013.

Personal life
His wife, Vesna Karadžić, is a former basketball player. The couple has two children - a daughter, Tamara (played for the Crvena zvezda women's team), and a son, Vuk, who also played basketball.

See also
List of Red Star Belgrade basketball coaches
 List of KK Crvena zvezda players with 100 games played

References

1960 births
Living people
Competitors at the 1983 Mediterranean Games
KK Borac Banja Luka players
KK Crvena zvezda assistant coaches
KK Crvena zvezda players
KK Crvena zvezda head coaches
KK Crvena zvezda youth coaches
KK Hemofarm coaches
KK Radnički Novi Sad players
KK Sloboda Tuzla players
KK Sutjeska players
Montenegrin expatriate basketball people in Serbia
Mediterranean Games gold medalists for Yugoslavia
Serbia national basketball team coaches
Serbian men's basketball coaches
Serbian expatriate basketball people in Bosnia and Herzegovina
Serbian expatriate basketball people in Croatia
Serbian expatriate basketball people in Hungary
Serbian expatriate basketball people in Montenegro
Serbian expatriate basketball people in Russia
Serbian men's basketball players
Serbs of Montenegro
Soproni KC players
Sportspeople from Nikšić
ŽKK Crvena zvezda coaches
Yugoslav men's basketball players
Mediterranean Games medalists in basketball